Jonas Omlin (born 10 January 1994) is a Swiss professional footballer who plays as a goalkeeper for  club Borussia Mönchengladbach and the Switzerland national team.

Club career
Omlin played for Kriens in the 1. Liga Promotion. He moved on to Luzern, but was loaned out to Le Mont-sur-Lausanne for the 2015/16 season. He returned to Luzern for two seasons.

FC Basel announced on 22 June 2018 that they had signed goalkeeper Omlin from Luzern. After five test games Omlin played his domestic league debut for his new club in the home game at the St. Jakob-Park on 21 July 2018 as Basel were defeated 2–1 by St. Gallen.

Under trainer Marcel Koller Basel won the Swiss Cup in the 2018–19 season. In the first round Basel beat FC Montlingen 3–0, in the second round Echallens Région 7–2 and in the round of 16 Winterthur 1–0. In the quarter finals Sion were defeated 4–2 after extra time and in the semi finals Zürich were defeated 3–1. All these games were played away from home. The final was held on 19 May 2019 in the Stade de Suisse Wankdorf Bern against Thun. Striker Albian Ajeti scored the first goal, Fabian Frei the second for Basel, then Dejan Sorgić netted a goal for Thun, but the end result was 2–1 for Basel. Omlin played in four cup games. On 12 August 2020, the club announced that Omlin had transferred to Montpellier as of straight away. In his two seasons with the club Omlin played a total of 92 games for Basel. 59 of these games were in the Nationalliga A, five in the Swiss Cup, six in the Champions League, nine in the UEFA Europa League and 13 were friendly games.

On 12 August 2020, Omlin signed for Montpellier.

On 19 January 2023, Omlin signed for Bundesliga club Borussia Mönchengladbach on a four-and-a-half year deal.

International career
In May 2019, he was named to the national team for the 2018–19 UEFA Nations League final matches but did not appear in the tournament.

He made his national team debut on 7 October 2020 in a friendly against Croatia.

Euro 2020
Originally called up to the Swiss squad for the Euro 2020, Omlin suffered a minor injury to his right ankle during the warm-up of the opening game. The Swiss Football Association called up Gregor Kobel to replace his position.

Career statistics

Club

International

Honours
Basel
Swiss Cup: 2018–19

References

External links

1994 births
Living people
People from Obwalden
Association football goalkeepers
Swiss men's footballers
Switzerland international footballers
SC Kriens players
FC Luzern players
FC Le Mont players
FC Basel players
Montpellier HSC players
Borussia Mönchengladbach players
Swiss Super League players
Ligue 1 players
Bundesliga players
UEFA Euro 2020 players
2022 FIFA World Cup players
Swiss expatriate footballers
Expatriate footballers in France
Swiss expatriate sportspeople in France
Expatriate footballers in Germany
Swiss expatriate sportspeople in Germany